Cyber Village Academy is a public charter school in Minneapolis, Minnesota, United States, chartered in 1997. It is located at 3810 E 56th Street.  The school serves students grades Kindergarten through 12.

History
Cyber Village Academy was founded in February 1997 with the original charter to serve the needs of home bound and hospitalized students who are in need of some help when it comes to school in the Minneapolis and St. Paul metro areas and was originally authorized by the Minneapolis Independent School District. It now also meets the needs of gifted education and twice exceptional students and is authorized by Innovative Quality Schools. Cyber Village Academy provides extensive support for people who need or want different learning plans.

Campus
Cyber Village Academy began the 2022–2023 school year in its new location, 3810 E 56th Street, Minneapolis, MN 55417, where we will be the sole occupant.  CVA purchased the building formerly owned and occupied by Hiawatha Leadership Academy - Morris Park.  Cyber Village Academy's new location is across from Morris Park.  We look forward to taking advantage of all that offers.

Curriculum
Cyber Village Academy offers two education options:

1) Fusion Program, Grades K-12 uses a hybrid approach: Students spend three days on campus and two days on-line each week. The school has expanded to K-12 in the 2015–2016 school year. Many families appreciate the high level of family involvement as well as the two distinct learning environments. Online days provide students with the opportunity to pursue enrichment activities, complete their work at their own pace, or work in their home environment. On online days, a study center is available for students who wish to use it.

2) Program for Accelerated Studies using Computer-Assisted Learning (PASCAL) -- 100% on line using web based on Edmentum and teacher developed lessons supported by licensed teachers and aligned to Minnesota standards.  Contact with teachers is via campus visit, telephone, email & Skype. This program is available to residents of Minnesota in 6th - 12th grade.

References

 https://web.archive.org/web/20101224173328/http://techlearning.com/article/3986
 http://www.twincities.com/ci_18350208?IADID=Search-www.twincities.com-www.twincities.com
 http://www.cybervillageacademy.org

External links
Innovative Quality Schools

Charter schools in Minnesota
Public elementary schools in Minnesota
Public middle schools in Minnesota
Public high schools in Minnesota
Schools in Hennepin County, Minnesota
1997 establishments in Minnesota